The 1996 World Rowing Championships were World Rowing Championships that were held on 11 August 1996 in conjunction with the World Junior Rowing Championships in Motherwell, Strathclyde, Scotland, United Kingdom. The event took place at Strathclyde Country Park. Since 1996 was an Olympic year for rowing, the World Championships did not include Olympic events scheduled for the 1996 Summer Olympics.

Medal summary

Men's events

Women's events

Medal table

References

World Rowing Championships
World Rowing Championships
World
World Championships, 1996
Rowing
Rowing competitions in the United Kingdom
World Rowing Championships
World Rowing Championships, 1996